Lal Bahadur Shastri Cup, also known as the Lal Bahadur Shastri Memorial Football Tournament, is an Indian association football tournament held in Delhi and organized by Shastri Football Club. The tournament was first started in 1978 in the memory of former Indian prime minister Lal Bahadur Shastri and is named after him. Apart from some top clubs from Delhi, clubs from neighbouring states also participated in the tournament.

Lal Bahadur Shastri Cup 14th edition returned  after 6 years of gap in 2004, with the last tournament being held in 2006 was won by Indian Air Force. The tournament has not been held since then.

Results

References 

Football cup competitions in India
Football in Delhi
1978 establishments in India
Defunct football competitions in India
2006 disestablishments in India